Fernando Drasler da Cunha (born 29 June 1988) is a Brazilian professional futsal player who plays as a defender for the Brazil national team.

Honours
Benfica
Taça da Liga: 2019–20

References

External links
Liga Nacional de Futsal profile
Liga Nacional Fútbol Sala profile

1988 births
Living people
Sportspeople from São Paulo
Brazilian men's futsal players
AD Sala 10 players
ElPozo Murcia FS players
S.L. Benfica futsal players
Brazilian expatriate sportspeople in Croatia
Brazilian expatriate sportspeople in Spain
Brazilian expatriate sportspeople in Portugal